Al-Siyaha Sport Club, is an Iraqi football team based in Baghdad, that plays in the Iraq Division Three.

Managerial history
 Khalaf Habash
 Qasim Mohammed

Famous players
Alaa Abbas (2011–2013)

See also
 2000–01 Iraqi Elite League
 2001–02 Iraq FA Cup
 2016–17 Iraq FA Cup

References

External links
 Al-Siyaha SC on Goalzz.com
 Iraq Clubs- Foundation Dates

1999 establishments in Iraq
Association football clubs established in 1999
Football clubs in Baghdad